Chaudhry Irshad Ahmad Arain is a Pakistani politician who was a Member of the Provincial Assembly of the Punjab, from May 2013 to May 2018.

Early life and education
He was born on 1 January 1953 in Burewala.

He graduated in 1999.

Political career

He was elected to the Provincial Assembly of the Punjab as a candidate of Pakistan Muslim League (Nawaz) from Constituency PP-233 (Vehari-II) in 2013 Pakistani general election.

References

Living people
Punjab MPAs 2013–2018
1953 births
People from Burewala
Pakistan Muslim League (N) politicians